"The Mooche" is an American jazz song, composed in 1928 by Duke Ellington and Irving Mills, with scat singing by vocalist Gertrude "Baby" Cox. The song is considered to be one of Ellington's signature pieces and "he performed it frequently and recorded it many times over 45 years."

Among the jazz musicians who recorded the original version of the song was James "Bubber" Miley whom Ellington described as "the epitome of soul and a master of the plunger mute." However, Miley's alcoholism and his consequent unreliability would lead to his parting with Ellington's band. Four years later, on May 20, 1932, Miley expired from tuberculosis. He was 29 years old. Despite his early death, "no one, apart from Duke himself, did more than Miley to shape the early Ellington sound."

Ellington composed the song "for a high reed trio, playing one of the most eerie and haunting themes he had created up to that time. The theme, a sixteen-bar blues with interpolations by Miley, is followed by an eight-bar orchestral tutti, and then segues to a low register solo by [Barney] Bigard. A [Lonnie] Johnson solo is followed by a Miley-inspired scat vocal by Baby Cox."

The song is in the so-called "jungle style" and includes the clarinet and muted trumpet typical of Ellington's work. The song is played in C minor.

The title, sometimes spelled "mooch," refers to "someone who constantly borrows but does not pay back." In 1933, Ellington explained that the title referred to "a certain lazy gait peculiar to some of the folk of Harlem."

References

External links 
 

1928 songs
Jazz songs
Songs with music by Duke Ellington
Songs with lyrics by Irving Mills
Jazz compositions in C minor